Jan Janse de Weltevree (1595 – not known) was a Dutch sailor and probably the first Dutchman to visit Korea. His adventures were recorded in the report by Dutch East India Company accountant Hendrik Hamel. Hamel stayed in Korea from 1653 to 1666.

Biography 
Jan Janse de Weltevree was born around 1595, according to Hendrik Hamel in De Rijp, though other sources speak of Vlaardingen. He signed on the ship 'Hollandia' and went on March 17, 1626, to the Dutch East Indies. He arrived in 1627 from Batavia, Dutch East Indies on the ship 'Ouwerkerck'. 
On July 16, 1627, the 'Ouwerkerck' with its captain Jan Janse de Weltevree captured a Chinese junk and its 150-man crew bound for the port of Amoy, China. Seventy Chinese were brought aboard the Ouwerkerck. Jan Janse de Weltevree, Dirk Gijsbertsz from De Rijp, and Jan Pieterse Verbaest from Amsterdam, all from Holland, along with thirteen other Dutch crewmen went aboard the junk to sail the vessel to Tainan, Formosa. The Ouwerkerck reached safe harbor after battling a fierce summer storm that swept the area.

The storm-tossed Chinese junk carrying the hapless Dutch and Chinese ended up on the shores of an island off Korea's west coast, during the reign of the Joseon Dynasty. Although the details of what happened next are unclear, the Chinese, with a five-to-one advantage, overpowered the Dutch survivors, captured Jan Janse de Weltevree, Dirk Gijsbertsz and Jan Verbaest, and handed them over to the Korean Joseon authorities.

The Joseon Dynasty of that time enforced an isolation policy so the captured privateers could not leave the country. Jan Janse de Weltevree took the name Park Yeon (박연, Park is a Korean surname.) and became an important government official. He married a Korean woman with whom he had two children.

According to Jan Janse de Weltevree, the two other captives from the Ouwerkerck were killed in 1636 during a raid of the Manchu. They would have fought in the Korean army.

In 1653 the ship 'De Sperwer' was wrecked en route from Jakarta to Nagasaki, with Hendrick Hamel on board, and Jan Janse de Weltevree acted as a translator and adviser.  This group of 36 Dutchmen stayed in Korea for 13 years, working as military advisors to the Joseon Army, until 8 of them escaped to Nagasaki in 1666. Hendrick Hamel authored the accounts of his stay in Korea, from which we hear about Jan Janse de Weltevree.

Legacy 
Besides the Great Church in De Rijp is a statue of Jan Jansz. A replica of this was erected in 1991 in the capital, Seoul.

See also
Hendrick Hamel
Dutch East India Company
Hermit Kingdom
Dutch East Indies
Dutch Formosa
Dejima

References

1595 births
Year of death unknown
17th-century Dutch explorers
Dutch expatriates in Korea
History of De Rijp
Joseon people
Korean people of Dutch descent
Netherlands–South Korea relations
People from Graft-De Rijp
Sailors on ships of the Dutch East India Company
Dutch East India Company people
Dutch privateers